Lavin is a former municipality in the district of Inn in the Swiss canton of Graubünden.  On 1 January 2015 the former municipalities of Lavin and Susch merged into the municipality of Zernez.

History
Lavin is first mentioned in the 12th century as Lawinis.

Geography

Of this area, 19.9% is used for agricultural purposes, while 18.3% is forested. Of the rest of the land, 0.6% is settled (buildings or roads) and the remainder (61.2%) is non-productive (rivers, glaciers or mountains).

The former municipality is located in the Sur Tasna sub-district of the Inn district on the left bank of the Inn river.  It is the capital of the sub-district.  It consists of the linear village of Lavin.

Demographics
Lavin had a population (as of 2014) of 221.  , 8.5% of the population was made up of foreign nationals.  Over the last 10 years the population has grown at a rate of 7.2%.

, the gender distribution of the population was 46.9% male and 53.1% female.  The age distribution, in Lavin is; 18 children or 10.3% of the population are between 0 and 9 years old.  14 teenagers or 8.0% are 10 to 14, and 12 teenagers or 6.9% are 15 to 19.  Of the adult population, 15 people or 8.6% of the population are between 20 and 29 years old.  20 people or 11.5% are 30 to 39, 25 people or 14.4% are 40 to 49, and 22 people or 12.6% are 50 to 59.  The senior population distribution is 14 people or 8.0% of the population are between 60 and 69 years old, 25 people or 14.4% are 70 to 79, there are 7 people or 4.0% who are 80 to 89, and there are 2 people or 1.1% who are 90 to 99.

In the 2007 federal election the most popular party was the SPS which received 46.8% of the vote.  The next three most popular parties were the SVP (26.1%), the FDP (15.5%) and the CVP (6.1%).

The entire Swiss population is generally well educated.  In Lavin about 87.7% of the population (between age 25-64) have completed either non-mandatory upper secondary education or additional higher education (either university or a Fachhochschule).

Lavin has an unemployment rate of 0.71%.  , there were 20 people employed in the primary economic sector and about 8 businesses involved in this sector.  2 people are employed in the secondary sector and there is 1 business in this sector.  50 people are employed in the tertiary sector, with 9 businesses in this sector.

The historical population is given in the following table:

Languages
Most of the population speaks Rhaeto-Romance (75.9%), with German being second most common (23.0%) and Portuguese being third ( 0.6%).  By the 19th Century there was a German-speaking minority in Lavin.  However the majority speak the Vallader Romansh dialect.  Between 1880 and 1941 the Romansh speaking percentage remained the same (83%).  In the last decades the Romansh speaking percentage has decreased.  In 1990 91% of the population understood Romansh, though some spoke it as a second language, and in 2000 it was 86%.

Heritage sites of national significance

The abandoned village of Gonda is listed as a Swiss heritage site of national significance.  Gonda was first mentioned about 1160 and by the 17th Century was abandoned.  In 1983 it was restored.

References

Zernez
Former municipalities of Graubünden
Cultural property of national significance in Graubünden
Populated places on the Inn (river)
Silvretta Alps